Sand Hill may refer to:
Sand Hill, Estill County, Kentucky
Sand Hill, Harlan County, Kentucky
Sand Hill, Lewis County, Kentucky
Sand Hill, Warren County, Kentucky
a former name for Prospect, Kentucky, in Fayette County